Bematistes is a genus of butterflies in the family Nymphalidae. The genus is often included in Acraea.

Species
umbra species group:
Bematistes adrasta (Weymer, 1892)
Bematistes aganice (Hewitson, 1852)
Bematistes alcinoe (Felder, 1865)
Bematistes consanguinea (Aurivillius, 1893)
Bematistes elongata (Butler, 1874)
Bematistes epiprotea (Butler, 1874)
Bematistes excisa (Butler, 1874)
Bematistes formosa (Butler, 1874)
Bematistes macaria (Fabricius, 1793)
Bematistes macarista (Sharpe, 1906)
Bematistes obliqua (Aurivillius, 1913)
Bematistes persanguinea (Rebel, 1914)
Bematistes poggei (Dewitz, 1879)
Bematistes pseudeuryta (Godman & Salvin, 1890)
Bematistes quadricolor Rogenhöfer, 1891
Bematistes scalivittata (Butler, 1896)
Bematistes umbra (Drury, [1782])
Bematistes vestalis (Felder, 1865)
epaea species group:
Bematistes epaea (Cramer, 1779)
Bematistes tellus (Aurivillius, 1893)
incertae sedis:
Bematistes indentata (Butler, 1895)
Bematistes leopoldina (Aurivillius, 1895)

Acraea simulata is sometimes placed in the masamba group of Acraea, sometimes included in the Bematistes umbra group.

External links
Bematistes archived link to an old version of Markku Savela's Lepidoptera and Some Other Life Forms

Acraeini
Nymphalidae genera
Taxa named by Francis Hemming